is a Japanese professional boxer, who held the OPBF and WBO Asia Pacific light-flyweight titles in 2022. He is a one-time WBO light-flyweight title challenger, having fought for the title in 2022.

Early life and amateur career
Iwata became interested in combat sports at the age of 9, after meeting Norifumi Yamamoto. He took up boxing in his second year of middle school. He won the U-15 national boxing tournament while in the third year of middle school.

After graduating from middle school, Iwata attended the Hiji High School. During his high school amateur career, he achieved notable victories against Takuma Inoue and Kosei Tanaka, and won the national boxing tournament while in the third year of high school. After graduating from high school, Iwata entered the Sport Sciences course at the Waseda University on a sports recommendation.

Professional boxing career

Early career
Iwata made his professional debut against Joel Bermudez on 8 December 2018, at the StubHub Center in Carson, California. He won the fight by a fourth-round knockout. He made his debut in the United States, as he was only given his domestic boxing license by the JBC on 31 January 2019, which allowed him to compete in Japan.

Iwata faced the 2018 All Japan Light Flyweight "Rookie of the Year" Daiki Kameyama on 4 May 2019, at the Korakuen Hall in Tokyo, Japan. He won the fight by unanimous decision, with two judges awarding him a 59-54 scorecard, while the third judge scored it 58–56. Although he had won nearly every round of the bout, Iwata appeared dissatisfied with his performance, stating "I wanted to hit the body a little more".

Iwata was scheduled to face Paolo Sy on 12 July 2019, at the EDION Arena Osaka in Osaka, Japan, on the undercard of the WBA middleweight title fight between Rob Brant and Ryota Murata. He won the fight by a fifth-round technical knockout. Iwata suffered a cut above his right eye in the third round, due to an accidental clash of heads.

Iwata faced Alejandro Cruz Valladares on 7 November 2019, in the featured bout of the Nonito Donaire and Naoya Inoue bantamweight title bout undercard. He won the fight by a fifth-round technical knockout, stopping Valladares with a flurry of punches at the 2:10 minute mark.

Iwata was scheduled to face Ryo Narizuka on 2 October 2020. He won the fight by a seventh-round technical knockout. Iwata was next scheduled to face Toshimasa Ouchi on 5 June 2021. He won the fight by unanimous decision, with scores of 78–73, 79–72 and 78–73.

Regional light flyweight titlist

Japanese champion
Iwata was expected to face Rikito Shiba for the vacant Japanese light-flyweight title on 11 September 2021, at the Korakuen Hall in Tokyo, Japan. The fight had to be postponed the day before however, as Iwata tested positive for COVID-19 after successfully making weight. The title bout was postponed for 5 November 2021. Iwata won the first ten-round fight of his career by a ninth-round technical knockout. He knocked Shiba down in the sixth round, and appeared to once again knock him down in the eight round as well, although the second knockdown was ruled a slip by referee Tetsuya Iida. Immediately after action resumed in the ninth-round, Iwata forced Shiba back with a flurry of punches which forced the referee to wave the fight off.

Iwata was booked to make his first Japanese light-flyweight title defense in a rematch with Toshimasa Ouchi. The fight was scheduled as the headliner of the March 5, 2022, "Dynamic Glove" event, and was broadcast by G+. Iwata won the fight by a first-round knockout, flooring Ouchi with a counter right hand. Although Ouchi was able to rise from the canvas in time, he was unsteady on his feet, which prompted the referee to wave the bout off. Iwata was awarded the MVP award for the month of March by the East Japan Boxing Association, following this victory.

Japanese, WBO AP and OPBF champion
Iwata was booked to make his second Japanese title defense in a title unification bout with the OPBF light-flyweight champion Kenichi Horikawa at the Korakuen Hall on July 2, 2022. Aside from the Japanese and OPBF titles, the vacant WBO Asia Pacific title will be contested as well. Iwata won the fight by unanimous decision, with scores of 118–110, 117–111 and 116–112. He was given the July "Fighter of the Month" award by the East Japan Boxing Commission following this victory. On August 19, 2022, the Japanese Boxing Association gave him the "Skill Award" for the year 2022.

Iwata vs. González
On 3 September 2022, it was announced that Iwata would challenge the reigning WBO light flyweight champion Jonathan González. Their fight was scheduled as the co-main event of the Kenshiro Teraji and Hiroto Kyoguchi light flyweight unification bout, which took place on 1 November 2022. He lost the fight by unanimous decision, with two scorecards of 116–112 and one scorecard of 117–111.

Professional boxing record

References

1996 births
Living people
Sportspeople from Tokyo
Japanese male boxers
Light-flyweight boxers